Naro is a comune in the province of Agrigento, on the island of Sicily, Italy. It is bounded by the comuni of Agrigento, Caltanissetta, Camastra, Campobello di Licata, Canicattì, Castrofilippo, Delia, Favara, Licata, Palma di Montechiaro, Ravanusa and Sommatino. The naturalised French composer Achille Campisiano (1837–1901) was born in this village. It is also the birthplace of Il Volo singer Piero Barone.

History 
There was already a settlement in the area of Naro in the Roman era, of which remains such as catacombs and ruins of Roman villas have been found. It was an important fortified town during the Arab and the Norman occupation, and remained a regional centre. The medieval castle, the ruined Norman church and several baroque buildings testify to its rich history.

In the Second World War, Naro was damaged by aerial bombing.

Naro is famous for the festival of its local patron Saint, San Calogero, which is celebrated on June 18. On this day, a statue of the Saint is carried through the city streets in a procession with many participants.

References

External links